William Butler Ogden (June 15, 1805 – August 3, 1877) was an American politician and railroad executive who served as the first Mayor of Chicago.  He was referred to as "the Astor of Chicago." He was, at one time, the city's richest citizen.

Early life
Ogden was born on June 15, 1805, in Walton, New York.  He was the son of Abraham Ogden (1771–1825) and Abigail (née Weed) Ogden (1788–1850).

When still a teenager, his father died and Ogden took over the family real estate business. He assisted Charles Butler, his brother-in-law, with business matters related to opening a new building for New York University, attending the law school for a brief period himself.

Career

Political career
The first political position Ogden held was as Postmaster of Walton, New York, having been appointed by President Andrew Jackson to the position.

He was a member of the New York State Assembly (Delaware Co.) in 1835.

During his career in New York politics, Ogden was a Jacksonian Democrat. However, Ogden was also an advocate of government funding for infrastructural improvements, aspiring to see the federal government financially back the construction of a railroad from New York to Chicago. He told colleagues that such a railroad would be "the most splendid system of internal communication ever yet devised by man." He had been elected to the New York Senate on a platform supporting state funding for the construction of the New York and Erie Railroad. The bill he backed to accomplish this was passed.

While Ogden's initial concern in Chicago was based in his land interests there, he believed that he could not afford to stay out of the politics of the city, as he believed growing western towns such as Chicago were dependent on government assistance.

Shortly after moving to Chicago in 1836, Ogden joined the committee responsible for drafting the city charter to be submitted to the state legislature.

In 1837, he was elected the first mayor of Chicago, serving a single one-year term. From 1840 through 1841, he served on the Chicago Common Council as an alderman from the 6th Ward. From 1847 through 1848, he served as an alderman from the 9th Ward.

Ogden was booster of Chicago both during and after his tenures in elected office. At the time he came to Chicago, its buildings were largely wood cabins, it lacked sidewalks and decent bridges, it had no paved roads, and it lacked water supply infrastructure. As a politician he advocated for the city to raise tax revenue for new roads, plank sidewalks, and bridges (which he presented designs of his own for). He also used his own wealth to fund improvements to the city's infrastructure.

Railroad career
Ogden was a leading promoter and investor in the Illinois and Michigan Canal, then switched his loyalty to railroads. Throughout his later life, Ogden was heavily involved in the building of several railroads. "In 1847, Ogden announced a plan to build a railway out of Chicago, but no capital was forthcoming. Eastern investors were wary of Chicago's reputation for irrational boosterism, and Chicagoans did not want to divert traffic from their profitable canal works. So Ogden and his partner J. Young Scammon solicited subscriptions from the farmers and small businessmen whose land lay adjacent to the proposed rail. Farmer's wives used the money they earned from selling eggs to buy shares of stock on a monthly payment plan. By 1848, Ogden and Scammon had raised $350,000—enough to begin laying track. The Galena and Chicago Union Railroad was profitable from the start and eventually extended out to Wisconsin, bringing grain from the Great Plains into the city. As president of Union Pacific, Ogden extended the reach of Chicago's rail lines to the West coast."

In 1853, the Chicago Land Company, of which Ogden was a trustee, purchased land at a bend in the Chicago River and began to cut a channel, formally known as North Branch Canal, but also referred to as Ogden's Canal. The resulting island is now known as Goose Island.

In 1857, Ogden created the Chicago Dock and Canal Company.

Ogden designed the first swing bridge over the Chicago River and donated the land for Rush Medical Center. Ogden was also a founder of the Chicago Board of Trade.

Later Ogden served on the board of the Mississippi and Missouri Railroad and lobbied with many others for congressional approval and funding of the transcontinental railroad. After the 1862 Pacific Railroad Act, Ogden was named as the first president of the Union Pacific Railroad. Ogden was a good choice for the first president, but his railroad experience was most likely not the primary reason he was chosen; Ogden was a clever man who had many political connections. When Ogden came to lead the Union Pacific, the railroad was not fully funded and had not yet laid a single mile of track. The railroad existed largely on paper created by an act of Congress. As part of the 1862 Pacific Railroad Act, Congress named several existing railroad companies to complete portions of the project. Several key areas needed to link the East (Chicago) to the West had none, and hence the Union Pacific was formed by Congress. Ogden was a fierce supporter of the transcontinental railroad at a time of great unrest for the country and was quoted as saying:

 ''This project must be carried through by even-handed wise consideration and a patriotic course of policy which shall inspire capitalists of the country with confidence. Speculation is as fatal to it as secession is to the Union. Whoever speculates will damn this project.

As history now shows, eventually Ogden and many others got their wish.

Later life

On October 8, 1871, Ogden lost most of his prized possessions in the Great Chicago Fire. He also owned a lumber company in Peshtigo, Wisconsin, which burned the same day.

Personal life

He married Marianna Tuttle Arnot (1825–1904). Marianna was the daughter of Scottish born John Arnot and Harriet (née Tuttle) Arnot.  In New York, he named his home in the Highbridge, Bronx (named after the bridge now called Aqueduct Bridge over the Harlem River connecting Manhattan and the Bronx) Villa Boscobel.

Ogden died at his home in the Bronx on Friday, August 3, 1877.  The funeral was held August 6, 1877, with several prominent pallbearers including, Gouverneur Morris III, William A. Booth, Parke Godwin, Oswald Ottendorfer, William C. Sheldon, Martin Zborowski, and Andrew H. Green.  He was interred at Woodlawn Cemetery, Bronx.

Ogden, who had no children, left behind an estate valued at $10 million in 1877. Some of the money was used to fund a graduate school of science at the Old University of Chicago. Much was left to his niece Eleanor Wheeler, who married Alexander C. McClurg.

Legacy
Namesakes of William B. Ogden include a stretch of U.S. Highway 34, called Ogden Avenue in Chicago and its suburbs, Ogden International School of Chicago, which is located on Walton Street in Chicago, and Ogden Slip, a man-made harbor near the mouth of the Chicago River. Ogden Avenue in The Bronx is also named after him, as is Ogden, Iowa. The Arnot-Odgen Memorial Hospital, founded by his wife Mariana, also bears his namesake. Following his death, William B. Ogden left money to his hometown of Walton N.Y which was used for the construction of a library, completed in 1897, which bears his name, the William B. Ogden Free Library, and is still in use today.

References

1805 births
1877 deaths
Mayors of Chicago
Members of the New York State Assembly
19th-century American railroad executives
Union Pacific Railroad people
Illinois Democrats
Illinois Republicans
People from Walton, New York
People from the Bronx
19th-century American politicians
Burials at Woodlawn Cemetery (Bronx, New York)